Lee Jones (born 28 June 1988) is a Scotland international rugby union player. He played for Glasgow Warriors in the Pro14. He plays primarily at Wing but can also cover at Scrum-half.

Rugby Union career

Amateur career

Jones was educated at Selkirk High School and in 2012 graduated with BEng in Mechanical Engineering from Heriot Watt University. He first played rugby for Selkirk RFC and later for the Borders’ under-16 and under-18 teams. Jones was drafted to Currie in the Scottish Premiership for the 2017-18 season. Jones has been drafted to Glasgow Hawks in the Scottish Premiership for the 2018-19 season.

Professional career

Jones joined Edinburgh Rugby in 2010 after some standout performances for his hometown club Selkirk RFC. He caught the attention of then-coach Rob Moffat, who saw Lee Jones as a player that could bring pace to the Edinburgh team.

After joining Glasgow Warriors in February 2013, Jones made his debut in an 8-6 win over Connacht at Scotstoun. He then signed a two-year deal with the club in November 2014.  In March 2017, he signed an extension to his contract that would keep him with the Warriors until 2019. He signed a further 2 year deal in April 2019.

International career

Jones has played under-18, under-19 and under-20 grades and at Club XV and 7s for Scotland. He played in Scotland Club XV match against Ireland Club XV in March 2009, Scotland winning 31-18.

Jones's pace, and strength in the contact and an unquestionable eye for the try line resulted in a call up into the Scotland senior squad for the 2012 Six Nations Championship and started on the wing against England on 4 February, scoring his first try for Scotland against France, and becoming injured after a head clash with Andrew Trimble in the Scotland vs Ireland game, causing him to miss the game against Italy. To date he has won ten caps for Scotland, most recently against New Zealand in 2017.

Jones featured for Scotland 7s in the Commonwealth Games, scoring 14 tries, before extending his deal with the Warriors on a dual contract with Scotland 7s.

Jones has played on the IRB World Series Sevens circuit as well as featuring for the Warriors. He competed at the 2022 Rugby World Cup Sevens in Cape Town.

References

External links 
 Edinburgh Rugby player bio

1988 births
Living people
Alumni of Heriot-Watt University
Edinburgh Rugby players
Glasgow Warriors players
Rugby union wings
Scotland 'A' international rugby union players
Scotland international rugby union players
Scotland international rugby sevens players
Scottish rugby union players
Selkirk RFC players
Rugby union players from Edinburgh
Currie RFC players
Male rugby sevens players
Glasgow Hawks players
Scotland Club XV international rugby union players
Rugby sevens players at the 2022 Commonwealth Games